Rafferty and the Gold Dust Twins is a 1975 American comedy-drama film directed by Dick Richards and written by John Kaye. The film was the second film credit for Jerry Bruckheimer, who was an associate producer.  The film features the song "Honky Tonk Angels", performed by lead actress Sally Kellerman.

Plot

Idiotic, alcoholic driving instructor and former Marine Corps sergeant Rafferty (Alan Arkin) lives in poverty near Hollywood, California. He allows two young female hitchhikers (Sally Kellerman and Mackenzie Phillips), one an aspiring singer, to kidnap him who are seeking to reach New Orleans. He eventually enjoys their company, and the three take a road trip to Las Vegas and end up in Tucson, Arizona, with many misadventures and scams to finance their trip along the way.

Cast

Release
This film was released in the UK on 20 March 1977 as a double bill with Michael Apted's cult film The Squeeze.

Critical reception
The film received favorable reviews at the time. Richard F. Shepard of The New York Times stated: Rafferty and the Gold Dust Twins passes the time pleasantly enough...several belly laughs and lots of chuckles.

See also
 List of American films of 1975

References

External links 
 
 

1975 films
1975 comedy-drama films
1970s road comedy-drama films
American road comedy-drama films
1970s English-language films
Films about kidnapping
Films directed by Dick Richards
Films produced by Art Linson
Films set in Tucson, Arizona
Films set in California
Films set in the Las Vegas Valley
Warner Bros. films
1970s American films